Sergei Arkadyevich Yemelyanov (born 24 June 1981) is a Russian professional football coach and a former player.

Club career
He made his Russian Football National League debut for FC KAMAZ Naberezhnye Chelny on 31 March 2004 in a game against FC Neftekhimik Nizhnekamsk.

External links
 

1981 births
Sportspeople from Izhevsk
Living people
Russian footballers
Association football defenders
FC KAMAZ Naberezhnye Chelny players
FC Metallurg Lipetsk players
FC Krasnodar players
Russian football managers
FC Novokuznetsk players
FC Izhevsk players
FC Zenit-Izhevsk players
FC Nosta Novotroitsk players